"When Your Love is Gone" is a song by Australian rock musician, Jimmy Barnes. It was released in March 1991 as the fourth single from his fourth studio album, Two Fires. The song peaked at number 7 on the Australian ARIA Singles Chart.

Track listing
CD single (K 10321)
 "When Your Love Is Gone" - 5:12	
 "I'm Still On Your Side" (Live) - 4:40
 "One of a Kind" (Live) - 4:43

Charts

Certifications

References

Mushroom Records singles
1991 singles
1990 songs
Jimmy Barnes songs
Song recordings produced by Don Gehman
Songs written by Kevin Savigar
Songs written by Jimmy Barnes